Senator Earle may refer to:

Elias Earle (1762–1823), South Carolina State Senate
Horatio Earle (1855–1935), Michigan State Senate
Joseph H. Earle (1847–1897), U.S. Senator from South Carolina

See also
Jane Earll (born 1958), Pennsylvania State Senate
Jonas Earll Jr. (1786–1846), New York  State Senate